Rufolimosina is a subgenus of flies belonging to the family Lesser Dung flies.

Species
P. ornata Papp, 2008
P. oswaldi Papp, 2008

References

Sphaeroceridae
Diptera of Asia
Insect subgenera